The 1999–2000 Hazfi Cup was the 13th season of the Iranian football knockout competition. Teams from Tehran or Tehran province play each other only once.

Quarterfinals

Semifinals

Final

References

Hazfi Cup seasons
Iran
Cup